The 1989 Italian Open was a tennis tournament played on outdoor clay courts at the Foro Italico in Rome in Italy that was part of the 1989 Nabisco Grand Prix and of the Category 5 tier of the 1989 WTA Tour. The men's tournament was held from 15 May through 21 May 1989, while the women's tournament was played from 8 May through 14 May 1989. Alberto Mancini and Gabriela Sabatini won the singles titles.

Finals

Men's singles

 Alberto Mancini defeated  Andre Agassi 6–3, 4–6, 2–6, 7–6, 6–1
It was Mancini's 2nd title of the year and the 4th of his career.

Women's singles

 Gabriela Sabatini defeated  Arantxa Sánchez Vicario 6–2, 5–7, 6–4
It was Sabatini's 3rd title of the year and the 21st of her career.

Men's doubles

 Jim Courier /  Pete Sampras defeated  Danilo Marcelino /  Mauro Menezes 6–4, 6–3
It was Courier's 1st title of the year and the 1st of his career. It was Sampras' only title of the year and the 1st of his career.

Women's doubles

 Elizabeth Smylie /  Janine Tremelling defeated  Manon Bollegraf /  Mercedes Paz 6–4, 6–3
It was Smylie's 4th title of the year and the 25th of her career. It was Tremelling's 2nd title of the year and the 4th of her career.

References

External links
 
ATP Tournament Profile
WTA Tournament Profile